(an abbreviation for) was the State Committee for Publishing in the Soviet Union.

It had control over publishing houses, printing plants, the book trade, and was in charge of the ideological and political censorship of literature.

Goskomizdat chairmen 
1949–1953 – Leonid Pavlovich Grachev
1963–1965 – Pavel Konstantinovich Romanov
1965–1970 – Nikolai Alexandrovich Mikhailov
1970–1982 – Boris Ivanovich Stukalin
1982–1986 – Boris Nikolaevich Pastukhov
1986–1989 – Mikhail Fedorovich Nenashev
1989–1990 – Nikolay Ivanovich Efimov
1990–1991 – Mikhail Fedorovich Nenashev

See also

Samizdat
Glavlit
Eastern Bloc information dissemination
Censorship in the Soviet Union

References

State Committees of the Soviet Union
Censorship in the Soviet Union
Publishing, State Committee for
1991 disestablishments in the Soviet Union